The banded green sunbird (Anthreptes rubritorques) is a species of bird in the family Nectariniidae.
It is endemic to Tanzania.

Its natural habitats are subtropical or tropical moist lowland forest, subtropical or tropical moist montane forest, plantations, and rural gardens.
It is threatened by habitat loss.

References

External links
BirdLife Species Factsheet.

banded green sunbird
Endemic birds of Tanzania
banded green sunbird
Taxonomy articles created by Polbot